Aglaia pleuropteris is a species of plant in the family Meliaceae. It is mostly found in Vietnam but is occasionally found in Cambodia.

References

pleuropteris
Critically endangered plants
Taxonomy articles created by Polbot
Taxa named by Jean Baptiste Louis Pierre